Vöckönd is a village in Zala County, Hungary.

Location
Zalaegerszeg is 14 km northeast of Vöckönd.

History
The area was first mentioned in charters in the 1450s.  In the 1480s there was at least some sort of settlement, perhaps with a church that no longer stands today as well.

The present village is built on a hill and had a its church built in the early 1900s.  The architecture of the village is said to be typical Hungarian style for the time period.  A famous house in Szentendre Village became a museum and is known as the "Vöcköndi house."

References

Populated places in Zala County